The 2022 Wiesbaden Tennis Open was a professional tennis tournament played on outdoor clay courts. It was the thirteenth edition of the tournament which was part of the 2022 ITF Women's World Tennis Tour. It took place in Wiesbaden, Germany between 2 and 8 May 2022.

Singles main draw entrants

Seeds

 1 Rankings are as of 25 April 2022.

Other entrants
The following players received wildcards into the singles main draw:
  Kathleen Kanev
  Eva Lys
  Julia Middendorf
  Laura Siegemund

The following players received entry from the qualifying draw:
  Dalila Jakupović
  Sinja Kraus
  Ekaterina Makarova
  Justina Mikulskytė
  Andreea Roșca
  Joëlle Steur
  Eva Vedder
  Daniela Vismane

Champions

Singles

  Danka Kovinić def.  Nastasja Schunk, 6–3, 7–6(7–0)

Doubles

  Amina Anshba /  Panna Udvardy def.  Andrea Gámiz /  Eva Vedder, 6–2, 6–4

References

External links
 2022 Wiesbaden Tennis Open at ITFtennis.com
 Official website

2022 ITF Women's World Tennis Tour
2022 in German tennis
May 2022 sports events in Germany